Alma School District may refer to:

 Alma School District (Arkansas)
 Alma School District (Wisconsin), a school district in Wisconsin

See also
School District of Alma Center-Humbird-Merrillan